In the Name of Suffering is the debut album by American sludge metal band Eyehategod. It was initially released in 1990 through French independent label Intellectual Convulsion and reissued in 1992 by Century Media.

Background and recording
Eyehategod was formed in 1988 and recorded two demos, Garden Dwarf Woman Driver and Lack of Almost Everything, released in the years 1989 and 1990, respectively. Originally, the band did not take themselves seriously, and only formed to rebel against what they call "the norm of underground music at the time". The album was recorded and produced by the band themselves at Festival Studios in Kenner, Louisiana for about $1,000.

Release

The album was originally released by French label Intellectual Convulsion, but only around 1,500–2,000 CD and vinyl copies were pressed before the label had to shut down due to financial difficulties. The group would later be signed onto Century Media, who re-released the album with new artwork on December 1, 1992. In 2004, Emetic Records repressed the album on vinyl, 1,000 copies total: 300 green marbled, 700 black. In 2006, as a part of Century Media's 20th anniversary, the album was reissued with the original cover art and the entirety of the band's 1990 demo Lack of Almost Everything as bonus tracks. These same exact demo recordings also appeared on the band's 2001 live album 10 Years of Abuse (and Still Broke). The year 2008 saw Emetic Records again reissuing the album on vinyl, this time as a double disc LP set with the first disc being composed of the album itself and the second disc being made up of the same four bonus Lack of Almost Everything demos from the 2006 CD reissue. This 2008 pressing was limited to 500 black copies. This edition would later be repressed in 2011, again in quantities of 500 black copies

In 2015, the album, along with Take as Needed for Pain, was repressed on vinyl through Century Media. This 2015 pressing was made available on black, white (limited to 100 copies) and gold (limited to 500 copies) colored vinyl. Also released on the same day was a four-disc CD boxset containing the group's first four albums (including In the Name of Suffering).

Reception

Since its initial release, In the Name of Suffering has received praise for its rough style, and is seen as one of the first, as well as one of the most important, sludge metal albums of the 1990s. Heavy metal website Hellbound.ca mentioned how In the Name of Suffering, along with its follow-up Take as Needed for Pain, created the framework for "one of the most interesting, yet disturbing, bands around". In William York's review of the album for AllMusic, he states "Later Eyehategod albums have more memorable songs, but In the Name of Suffering arguably captures the band's compelling ugliness in its most raw state."

Track listing

Release history

Credits
 Mike IX Williams — vocals
 Mark Schultz — lead guitar
 Jimmy Bower — rhythm guitar
 Steve Dale — bass
 Joe LaCaze — drums

References

External links

Eyehategod albums
1990 debut albums